Saint-Beauzeil is a commune in the Tarn-et-Garonne department in the Occitania region in southern France. Saint-Beauzeil is a very sparsely populated rural commune.

Residents are called Saint-Beauzeillois in French.

See also
Communes of the Tarn-et-Garonne department

References

Communes of Tarn-et-Garonne